The Battle of Macroom was a skirmish fought on 10 May 1650, near Macroom, County Cork, in southern Ireland, during the Cromwellian conquest of Ireland. An English Parliamentarian force under Roger Boyle, (Lord Broghill), defeated an Irish Confederate force under David Roche.

Background
Boyle had taken Cork for the English Parliamentarians by inducing its English Royalist garrison to defect to the Parliamentary side, which they had served until 1648. This was a major help to Oliver Cromwell's campaign in Ireland, as it secured for him most of Munster and its port towns. The Irish and Royalist troops in the province retreated to western County Kerry, which is a natural stronghold due to its remote and mountainous terrain.

Battle
David Roche, an Irish officer, organised an offensive, out of Kerry with 1,400 men in May 1650, in an effort to relieve the Siege of Clonmel. Cromwell sent Boyle to intercept Roche's force with 1,500 infantry and 500 cavalrymen. When Roche realised that he was being pursued, he turned back. Rather than let the Irish force escape, Boyle followed them with his cavalry alone. He caught them at Macroom on 10 May. The English surprised the Irish with a cavalry charge before they could form up for battle and routed them. Several hundred Irish soldiers were killed. The Parliamentarian's losses were light. Roche's force broke up in disorder and fell back towards the mountains of Kerry.

Aftermath
The following day, Boyle besieged and took Carrigadrohid castle. His men had taken Boetius MacEgan, the Catholic Bishop of Ross prisoner and warned the garrison that they would kill him unless they surrendered. MacEgan told the garrison not to surrender and was then hanged in view of the castle walls. The garrison surrendered shortly afterwards but were allowed to march away unmolested.

Citations

References

Further reading

1650 in Ireland
Macroom 1650
Macroom 1650
History of County Cork
Macroom
Macroom